Prodactylioceras is genus of ammonite that lived during the Pliensbachian stage of early Jurassic. It has evolved from Reynesocoeloceras, but maybe not directly, but through Bettoniceras. Its fossils were found in Europe, Asia and North America.

While sometimes, genus Bettoniceras, which differs from Prodactylioceras only by lacking tubercules is considered valid, in other cases it is considered to be a synonym of this genus. Species as P. italicum, or P. colubriforme would not be in that case belonging to this genus, as they are members of genus Bettoniceras.

Description
Ammonites of this genus had evolute shells, with circular to slightly depressed whorl section. In compressed species, ribs were fine and often prorsiradiate and they were wearing ventrolateral tubercules. In depressed species, ribs are coarser and swollen, while ventrolateral tubercules are larger.

References

Dactylioceratidae
Pliensbachian life
Early Jurassic ammonites of Europe
Early Jurassic ammonites of Asia
Early Jurassic ammonites of North America
Ammonitida genera